Adelina Razetdinova (born 13 August 2000) is a Russian Paralympic swimmer. She won the bronze medal in the 2020 Summer Paralympics in the women's 100m breaststroke SB8.

References

2000 births
Living people
People from Bashkortostan
Swimmers at the 2020 Summer Paralympics
Medalists at the 2020 Summer Paralympics
Paralympic bronze medalists for the Russian Paralympic Committee athletes
Paralympic swimmers of Russia
Paralympic medalists in swimming
Russian female breaststroke swimmers
Russian female medley swimmers
S9-classified Paralympic swimmers
Sportspeople from Bashkortostan
21st-century Russian women